Peeter Ernits (born 11 June 1953 in Tallinn) is an Estonian zoologist, journalist and politician. He has been member of XIII and XIV Riigikogu.

In 1976 he graduated from University of Tartu in genetics.

1980-1988 he was the director of Estonian Museum of Natural History. 1998-2002 he was chief editor of the magazine Luup. 2004-2007 he was chief editor of newspaper Maaleht.

Since 2018 he is a member of Estonian Conservative People's Party.

References

1953 births
21st-century Estonian politicians
Conservative People's Party of Estonia politicians
Estonian editors
Estonian journalists
Estonian magazine editors
Estonian zoologists
Living people
Members of the Riigikogu, 2015–2019
Members of the Riigikogu, 2019–2023
People from Tallinn
Politicians from Tallinn
Recipients of the Order of the White Star, 5th Class